Gairn Water (also known as the River Gairn), situated in the Cairngorms National Park, is a river in Scotland with an elevation of 899 feet and a length of 4.75 kilometres.

Course
The Gairn's source stems from a number of tributaries on the slopes of Carn Eas and Ben Avon in the Grampian Mountains of Aberdeenshire in Scotland.
The river moves East South East for its entire course, passing through/near:
 Daldownie 
 Rinloan
 Dalfad
 Torbeg
 Lary
 Candacraig
 Bridge of Gairn 
before finally leading into the River Dee, near Ballater.

Tributaries
The River Gairn has many unnamed tributaries leading into it, but the named ones are as follows, from source to mouth:
 Wester Kim
 Wester Shenalt
 Eastercon
 Easter Shenalt
 Corndavon Burn
 Duchrie Burn
 Wester Sleach Burn
 Sleach Burn - a convergence of 'Allt Ruigh na Cuileige' and 'Allt Coire nam Freumh'
 Allt Coire na Cloiche
 Braenalion Burn
 Rinioan Burn
 Allt Coire an t-Slugain
 West Milton Burn (and) East Milton Burn
 Garchory Burn
 Glenbardy Burn
 Corrybeg Burn

References 

Rivers of Scotland